The Colossus is the fourth studio album by RJD2. It was released on RJ's Electrical Connections on January 19, 2010. It peaked at number 30 on the Billboard Top R&B/Hip-Hop Albums chart, number 4 on the Heatseekers Albums chart, and number 25 on the Independent Albums chart.

Critical reception

At Metacritic, which assigns a weighted average score out of 100 to reviews from mainstream critics, the album received an average score of 63, based on 16 reviews, indicating "generally favorable reviews".

Patrick Sisson of Pitchfork gave the album a 6.8 out of 10, saying, "Rjd2 showcases a grasp of mood and a talent for arranging on The Colossus." Mike Schiller of PopMatters gave the album 6 stars out of 10, calling it "a work by an artist who is maturing rather than lashing out."

Track listing

Charts

References

External links
 

2010 albums
RJD2 albums